Rolando Garibotti is an Argentinian and American professional climber, writer, and mountain guide. He is from Bariloche, Argentina. These days he splits his time between the town of El Chaltén, Argentina, and the Dolomites in Italy.

Notable climbs
2001 Infinite Spur, Mount Foraker, Alaska Range, Alaska, USA.  Fifth ascent of route with Steve House, June 9–10, 2001 in 25 hours (to summit) with 20 hours for the descent.
2005 El Arca de los vientos, Cerro Torre, Patagonia.
2008 Torre Traverse, (VI 5.11 A1 WI6 Mushroom Ice 6) Garibotti succeeded in accomplishing the first ascent of the traverse route with Colin Haley on January 21–24, 2008. This mountain group is situated in  Patagonia, Argentina. For maximum efficiency, Haley and Garibotti divided the leads based on their differing skills, with Haley leading the pure ice and rime pitches, and Garibotti leading the rock and rime-covered rock.

Other

Rolando Garibotti has gathered over a dozen trail workers, climbers and park employees to rebuild some of the most degraded trails in Los Glaciares National Park, in Patagonia.

Bibliography
 A mountain unveiled: a revealing analysis of Cerro Torre’s tallest tale, American Alpine Journal 2004.
 The Torre Traverse, Alpinist 25, 2008.

See also

List of climbers, alpinists and mountaineers

References

External links
Garibotti's Bio at Exum Mountain Guides

Argentine mountain climbers
American mountain climbers
Living people
Year of birth missing (living people)